The Iowa District West is one of the 35 districts of the Lutheran Church–Missouri Synod (LCMS), and covers the western half of the state of Iowa including the state capital, Des Moines; the rest of the state forms the Iowa District East. The Iowa District West includes approximately 175 congregations and missions, subdivided into 19 circuits, as well as 45 preschools and 8 elementary schools. Baptized membership in district congregations is approximately 59,000.

The Iowa District West was formed in 1936 when the Iowa District (created in 1879) was divided in half. District offices are located in Fort Dodge, Iowa. Delegates from each congregation meet in convention every three years to elect the district president, vice presidents, circuit counselors, a board of directors, and other officers.

Presidents
Rev. Adolph Schwidder, 1936–1945
Rev. Herbert W. Berner, 1945–1946
Rev. John Theodore Martin Hoemann, 1946–1948
Rev. Gustav W. Lobeck, 1948–1966
Rev. A. Ellis Nieting, 1966–1985
Rev. Richard G. Kapfer, 1985–2000
Rev. Paul G. Sieveking, 2000–2015
Rev. Dr. Steven Turner, 2015-Present

References

External links
Iowa District West web site
LCMS: Iowa District West
LCMS Congregation Directory

Lutheran Church–Missouri Synod districts
Protestantism in Iowa
Christian organizations established in 1936